The Rice Lake Carnegie Library was a Carnegie library in Rice Lake, Wisconsin. It was built in 1905, replacing a library based in the city's high school, and was one of 63 Carnegie libraries in Wisconsin. The city left the building for a new library in 1978, and the building was demolished on June 26, 1985.

The library was added to the National Register of Historic Places on June 20, 1980. It was removed from the National Register on March 20, 1986, following its demolition.

References

Library buildings completed in 1905
Libraries on the National Register of Historic Places in Wisconsin
Former National Register of Historic Places in Wisconsin
Neoclassical architecture in Wisconsin
Buildings and structures demolished in 1985
Buildings and structures in Barron County, Wisconsin
Carnegie libraries in Wisconsin
National Register of Historic Places in Barron County, Wisconsin
1905 establishments in Wisconsin